Lion Around is a 1950 Donald Duck cartoon featuring Donald Duck, his nephews Huey, Dewey, and Louie and Louie the Mountain Lion. The film is the first appearance of Louie the Mountain Lion. In this episode, Donald is tricked into thinking he is getting attacked by a cougar.

Plot
The cartoon opens with what appears to be one of Donald's nephews hunting a mountain lion in the forest, which turns out to be the three of them practicing: one is hunting the other two who are acting in a lion suit. Upon finding Donald's house, they notice Donald is baking a pie and decide to use their lion suit to distract him so they can get the pie for themselves.  One of the nephews then comes to Donald's house screaming, telling him there is a mountain lion outside. Donald rushes out with his gun but is chased away from the cottage by the two in the lion suit while the other obtains the pie. The disguised nephews follow Donald up a tree, but their disguise gets blown. One of them tries to convince Donald that this was merely a joke, but Donald scolds the nephews and gets his pie back. After telling them to stay out, he goes back to his home to continue baking.

While the nephews are lamenting over their failure to accomplish their goal, Louie the Mountain Lion comes along and scares them away. He then turns his attention to Donald, who he views as an easy, tasty meal.  He pounces on him, but Donald, thinking it is another trick by the nephews, repeatedly slaps Louie across the face, spanks him on the bottom with his tail, threatens to tear him apart if he saw (them) again and storms back into the house with his pie. Louie later becomes interested in the pie and eats part of it before Donald intervenes. Louie then bursts into the house and smashes the door on Donald, destroying his pie in the process. Still thinking that Louie is the nephews in disguise, he pulls at the mountain lion's head to try and pull it off. But when the nephews show him their lion suit, he still pulls at Louie's head while telling them to shut up, and continues to yell at Louie to give, but soon realizes his mistake when he does a double take and notices the nephews are outside and that Louie is a real lion.

Donald tries to apologize to the mountain lion, but Louie is beyond forgiving and gives a loud roar, whose sound waves knock Donald through a door into his hunting trophy room. Donald tries to fool him by posing as a decoy duck, but Louie sees past this. After a wild chase around the house, Louie chases him into a tree and claws away all the leaves trying to reach Donald. The nephews then give Donald a pie, which he gives to Louie, who decides not to eat Donald. And the pie process continues as the cartoon closes.

Voice cast
Clarence Nash as Donald Duck, Huey, Dewie, Louie, Louie the Mountain Lion

Home media
The short was released on December 11, 2007, on Walt Disney Treasures: The Chronological Donald, Volume Three: 1947-1950.

References

External links

1950 films
1950 animated films
1950 short films
Donald Duck short films
1950s Disney animated short films
Films directed by Jack Hannah
Films produced by Walt Disney
Films about cougars
Films scored by Oliver Wallace
1950s English-language films